The 2019–20 Telenet UCI Cyclo-cross World Cup was a season long cyclo-cross competition, organised by the Union Cycliste Internationale (UCI). The UCI Cyclo-cross World Cup took place between 14 September 2019 and 26 January 2020, over a total of nine events. The defending champions were Toon Aerts in the men's competition and Marianne Vos in the women's competition.

Points distribution
Points were awarded to all eligible riders at each race. The top ten finishers received points according to the following table:

 Elite riders finishing in positions 11 to 50 also received points, going down from 40 points for 11th place by one point per place to 1 point for 50th place.
 For the age group riders (excluding under-23 women), those finishing in positions 11 to 30 also received points, going down from 20 points for 11th place by one point per place to 1 point for 30th place. As well as this, only the top four scores for each rider count towards the World Cup standings.

Events
In comparison to the previous season, the race in Pontchâteau was replaced by the Cyclo-cross de Nommay and the two American races were swapped around.

Points standings

Elite men

Elite women

Notes

References

Sources

External links

World Cup
World Cup
UCI Cyclo-cross World Cup